Beriah Wilkins (July 10, 1846 – June 7, 1905) was an American politician and Civil War veteran who served three terms as a U.S. Representative from Ohio from 1883 to 1889.

Biography
Born near Richwood, Ohio, Wilkins attended the common schools of Marysville, Ohio.  During the American Civil War, he enlisted as a private in Company H, One Hundred and Thirty-sixth Regiment, Ohio Volunteer Infantry, May 2, 1864, and served until honorably discharged August 31, 1864.  He then engaged in banking in Uhrichsville, Ohio.  He was a member of the Ohio Senate in 1880 and 1881 and served as member of the Democratic State central committee in 1882.

Congress 
Wilkins was elected as a Democrat to the Forty-eighth, Forty-ninth, and Fiftieth Congresses (March 4, 1883 – March 3, 1889).  He served as chairman of the Committee on Banking and Currency (Fiftieth Congress).

Later career and death 
After his congressional service, Wilkins settled in Washington, D.C. He became majority owner and publisher of The Washington Post in 1889, and later, in 1894, acquired the entire stock ownership of the paper, serving as editor until his death in Washington, D.C., June 7, 1905.  He is interred in Rock Creek Cemetery.

References
 Retrieved on 2009-03-26

1846 births
1905 deaths
People from Richwood, Ohio
The Washington Post people
19th-century American newspaper editors
Democratic Party Ohio state senators
People of Ohio in the American Civil War
Union Army soldiers
Burials at Rock Creek Cemetery
People from Uhrichsville, Ohio
19th-century American politicians
Journalists from Ohio
Democratic Party members of the United States House of Representatives from Ohio